Protium may refer to:

 Protium (isotope) or hydrogen-1, the most common isotope of the element hydrogen, with one proton, one electron, and no neutrons
 Protium (plant), a genus of chiefly tropical American trees in the family Burseraceae, having fragrant wood
 Cadence Protium, hardware accelerated prototyping platforms for early software development by Cadence Design Systems

See also
 Protonix, a commercial name for pantoprazole, a proton pump inhibitor drug